Renzo Grandi (29 April 1934 – 17 June 1982) was an Italian weightlifter. He competed at the 1960 Summer Olympics and the 1964 Summer Olympics.

References

1934 births
1982 deaths
Italian male weightlifters
Olympic weightlifters of Italy
Weightlifters at the 1960 Summer Olympics
Weightlifters at the 1964 Summer Olympics
Sportspeople from Mantua
20th-century Italian people